Chapelfields may refer to:
Chapelfields, Coventry, a suburb of Coventry, West Midlands, England
Chapelfield, a large indoor shopping mall located on the edge of Norwich city centre

See also
Chapel Field Christian School, a non-denominational Christian school located in Pine Bush, New York